Jim Kelly Field  is a public use airport two miles northwest of Lexington, in Dawson County, Nebraska.

Facilities
It has two runways: 14/32 is 5,489 by 100 feet (1,673 x 30 m) concrete; 1/19 is 3,200 by 250 feet (975 x 76 m) turf. In the year ending August 16, 2007 the airport had 10,640 aircraft operations, average 29 per day: 96% general aviation, 4% air taxi and <1% military.

References

External links 
 

Airports in Nebraska
Buildings and structures in Dawson County, Nebraska